Srichaphan is a Thai surname. Notable people with the surname include:

Narathorn Srichaphan (born 1972), Thai tennis player
Paradorn Srichaphan (born 1979), Thai tennis player
Thanakorn Srichaphan (born 1968), Thai tennis player and coach

Thai-language surnames